The 2013 Lower Saxony state election was held on 20 January 2013 to elect the members of the 17th Landtag of Lower Saxony. The incumbent coalition government of the Christian Democratic Union (CDU) and Free Democratic Party (FDP) led by Minister-President David McAllister was defeated. The Social Democratic Party (SPD) formed a government with The Greens which held a slim, one-seat majority. Stephan Weil was subsequently elected Minister-President.

Background
The CDU–FDP coalition had governed since the 2003. In the 2008 state election, the SPD under Wolfgang Jüttner lost more than three percentage points, suffering its worst ever result in Lower Saxony. The FDP retained their status as the third strongest party, leading the Greens by just 0.2%. The Left won 7.1 percent of the vote, crossing the electoral threshold and winning seats for the first time.

Most polls taken in early 2012 showed a SPD–Green majority. However, in the lead-up to the election, polls tightened, with the CDU–FDP coalition virtually neck and neck with the SPD–Green coalition. Polling suggested that the FDP's vote could be very close to 5%, which led some officials in the CDU to suggest tactically voting FDP to ensure it met the threshold.

Before the election, the SPD and Greens announced their plan to govern and campaign together. The CDU acted independently of the FDP during the campaign, but sought to continue the incumbent coalition. If a CDU–FDP coalition could not be formed, the CDU stated that the SPD would be their second choice. However, the SPD itself rejected the idea of a grand coalition.

Electoral system
The system used was Mixed-member proportional representation. The results in the electoral districts were determined using FPTP and the overall result using the D'Hondt method.

Parties
The table below lists parties represented in the 16th Landtag of Lower Saxony.

Opinion polling

Election result

|-
|colspan="12"| 
|-
! colspan="2" | Party
! Votes
! %
! +/-
! Constituencies
! List seats
! Total seats 
! +/-
! Total seats %
|-
| bgcolor=| 
| align=left | Christian Democratic Union (CDU)
| align=right| 1,287,549
| align=right| 36.0
| align=right| 6.5
| align=right| 54
| align=right| 0
| align=right| 54
| align=right| 14
| align=right| 39.4
|-
| bgcolor=| 
| align=left | Social Democratic Party (SPD)
| align=right| 1,165,419
| align=right| 32.6
| align=right| 2.3
| align=right| 33
| align=right| 16
| align=right| 49
| align=right| 1
| align=right| 35.8
|-
| bgcolor=| 
| align=left | Alliance 90/The Greens (Grüne)
| align=right| 489,473
| align=right| 13.7
| align=right| 5.7
| align=right| 0
| align=right| 20
| align=right| 20
| align=right| 8
| align=right| 14.6
|-
| bgcolor=| 
| align=left | Free Democratic Party (FDP)
| align=right| 354,970
| align=right| 9.9
| align=right| 1.7
| align=right| 0
| align=right| 14
| align=right| 14
| align=right| 1
| align=right| 10.2
|-
! colspan=8|
|-
| bgcolor=| 
| align=left | The Left (Linke)
| align=right| 112,212
| align=right| 3.1
| align=right| 4.0
| align=right| 0
| align=right| 0
| align=right| 0
| align=right| 11
| align=right| 0
|-
| bgcolor=| 
| align=left | Pirate Party Germany (Piraten)
| align=right| 75,603
| align=right| 2.1
| align=right| 2.1
| align=right| 0
| align=right| 0
| align=right| 0
| align=right| ±0
| align=right| 0
|-
| 
| align=left | Free Voters (FW)
| align=right| 39,714
| align=right| 1.1
| align=right| 0.6
| align=right| 0
| align=right| 0
| align=right| 0
| align=right| ±0
| align=right| 0
|-
| bgcolor=|
| align=left | Others
| align=right| 49,960
| align=right| 1.4
| align=right| 
| align=right| 0
| align=right| 0
| align=right| 0
| align=right| ±0
| align=right| 0
|-
! align=right colspan=2| Total
! align=right| 3,574,900
! align=right| 100.0
! align=right| 
! align=right| 87
! align=right| 50
! align=right| 137
! align=right| 15
! align=right| 
|-
! align=right colspan=2| Voter turnout
! align=right| 
! align=right| 59.4
! align=right| 2.4 
! colspan="5"|
|-
| colspan="12"| Lower Saxon Returning Officer
|-
|}

Sources

2013 elections in Germany
2013
January 2013 events in Germany